Peter Ország (born October 23, 1969 in Košice) is a Slovak ice hockey referee, who referees in the Slovak Extraliga.

Career
He has officiated many international tournaments including the Winter Olympics. He has been named Slovak referee of the year.

References 

1969 births
Living people
Slovak ice hockey officials
Sportspeople from Košice